Hulhudhoo as a place name may refer to:
 Hulhudhoo (Baa Atoll) (Republic of Maldives)
 Hulhudhoo (Raa Atoll) (Republic of Maldives)
 Hulhudhoo (Addu) (Republic of Maldives)